Ana María Dellai (16 October 1929 – 15 February 1986) was an Argentine alpine skier.

Biography 
Dellai is a former member of Club Andino Bariloche. She competed at the 1952 Winter Olympics hosted in Oslo, Norway, in the downhill, slalom and giant slalom events and placed 28th–31st. She was the only female competitor from the Argentine Delegation at those Olympics, as well the first woman to represent Argentina at the Winter Olympics. She was the Flag bearer of the delegation during the opening ceremony.

In 1954, she was part of the cast of the movie Canción de la nieve.

References

External links
 

1929 births
1986 deaths
Alpine skiers at the 1952 Winter Olympics
Olympic alpine skiers of Argentina
Argentine female alpine skiers